The Hands of Man is singer/songwriter Chris de Burgh's twentieth original album, released in 2014.

De Burgh announced during his Live in Concert 2013 tour that he had completed work on his 20th studio album, entitled "The Hands of Man". Briefly describing the title, de Burgh explained that "hands can perform miracles, they can save lives and end lives".  The album uses this concept as a basis for the themes of the album's songs. Following this introduction, de Burgh went on to play the unreleased "The Fields of Agincourt", a song which takes inspiration from the 15th century Battle of Agincourt, between the English & French.

The album was released on 26 September 2014 in mainland Europe. It peaked at number 8 in the German album chart, and reached number 71 in the UK Albums Chart.

Track listing 
All songs written by Chris de Burgh.

Sunrise 
"The Hands of Man" - 4:46
"There Goes My Heart Again" - 3:24
"Big City Sundays" - 3:26
"Where Would I Be?" - 4:01
"The Ghost of Old King Richard" - 2:55
"The Candlestick" - 3:42
"Through These Eyes" - 3:02
"The Keeper of the Keys" - 4:55
"Meridiem" - 2:09
Sunset 
"Letting Go" - 3:19
"When the Dream Is Over" - 3:36
"Empty Rooms" - 3:37
"The Bridge" - 4:21
"The Fields of Agincourt" - 5:05
"One More Goodbye" - 3:17

Personnel 
 Chris de Burgh – vocals, acoustic piano, guitars 
 Nigel Hopkins – keyboards, orchestrations 
 Phil Palmer – guitars
 Neil Taylor – guitars
 Geoffrey Richardson – tenor banjo, viola, violin
 Ed Poole – bass guitar 
 Geoff Dugmore – drums 
 Jay Craig – bass clarinet 
 Mark White – trumpet 
 Jakko Jakszyk – backing vocals 
 Ffion Wilkins – backing vocals

Production 
 Chris de Burgh – producer, sleeve design 
 Chris Porter – producer, recording, engineer, mixing 
 Jason Elliott – engineer
 Joe Kearns – engineer 
 Ian Lloyd-Bisley – technical assistant, logistics 
 Alex Hutchinson – art direction 
 Sarah Fulford – art direction, sleeve design, photography 
 Kenny Thomson – sleeve design, management 
 Dave Morley – photography

References

External links
http://www.allmusic.com/album/the-hands-of-man-mw0002727520

2014 albums
Chris de Burgh albums